Botryotinia is a genus of ascomycete fungi causing several plant diseases. The anamorphs of Botryotinia are mostly included in the "imperfect fungi" genus Botrytis. The genus contains 22 species and one hybrid.

Plant diseases caused by Botryotinia species appear primarily as blossom blights and fruit rots but also as leaf spots and bulb rots in the field and in stored products. The fungi induce host cell death resulting in progressive decay of infected plant tissue, whence they take nutrients. Sexual reproduction takes place with ascospores  produced in apothecia, conidia are the means of asexual reproduction. Sclerotia of plano-convexoid shape are typical. Some species also cause damping off, killing seeds or seedlings during or before germination.

Botryotinia fuckeliana (or its anamorph Botrytis cinerea) is an important species for wine industry as well as horticulture. 
Other economically important species include Botryotinia convoluta (the type species of the genus), Botryotinia polyblastis, Botrytis allii and Botrytis fabae. Botrytis tulipae is a serious pest of tulip crops and Botrytis narcissicola the bulbs of Narcissus.

Taxonomy 
For a complete list of species, see Beever and Weeds, Table 1. 

Selected species (anamorph, teleomorph) include;

 Botrytis allii Munn
 Botrytis cinerea Pers.:Fr.—  Botryotinia fuckeliana (de Bary) Whetzel
 Botryotinia convoluta (Drayton) Whetzel
 Botrytis fabae Sardiña
 Botrytis narcissicola Kleb. ex Westerd. & JFH Beyma syn. Sclerotinia narcissicola
 Botryotinia polyblastis Dowson syn. Sclerotinia polyblastis
 Botrytis tulipae Lind

References

Bibliography 
 WR Jarvis.Botryotinia and Botrytis species : taxonomy, physiology and pathogenicity : a guide to the literature (1977)

External links 
 Index Fungorum
 
 Staats et al.2004 
 Synoptic keys to the inoperculate stromatic discomycetes in the Nordic countries 

Sclerotiniaceae
Fungal plant pathogens and diseases